Northern Stars are a New Zealand netball team based in South Auckland. Since 2017 they have competed in the ANZ Premiership. The team was named after the Matariki star cluster which is also featured on the team's logo. They were grand finalists in 2019 and 2021.

History

Formation
After Netball Australia and Netball New Zealand announced that the ANZ Championship would be discontinued after the 2016 season, Netball New Zealand subsequently replaced it with the ANZ Premiership. The founding members of the ANZ Premiership included the five former New Zealand ANZ Championship teams – Central Pulse, Mainland Tactix, Northern Mystics, Southern Steel and Waikato Bay of Plenty Magic  – plus a brand new franchise, the South Auckland-based Northern Stars. The team was named after the Matariki star cluster which is also featured on the team's logo. Former Melbourne Vixens head coach, Julie Hoornweg, was named Stars inaugural head coach and Leana de Bruin became their first captain. Other members of the inaugural squad included vice captain Courtney Tairi plus Kayla Cullen, Maia Wilson, Malia Paseka and Sulu Fitzpatrick.

ANZ Premiership
Since 2017, Stars have played in the ANZ Premiership. They were grand finalists in 2019. In 2022, Stars were grand finalists for a second time.

Regular season statistics

Grand finals
ANZ Premiership

Home venues
Since 2018, Stars main home venue has been Takanini's Pulman Arena.

Notable players

2023 squad

Internationals

 Ama Agbeze

 Kelera Nawai-Caucau
 Afa Rusivakula

 Julianna Naoupu

 Leana de Bruin

 Vika Koloto

 Daystar Swift

Captains

Coaches

Head coaches

Assistant coaches

Main sponsors

Reserve team
Since 2017, Northern Comets have competed in the National Netball League. They are effectively the reserve team of Northern Stars. Comets were originally governed and managed by Netball Northern. However in November 2019, Northern Stars began to directly manage the team. In 2019, Temepara Bailey was appointed Comets head coach.
In 2021 she guided Comets to the NNL grand final.

Honours

ANZ Premiership
Runners Up: 2019, 2021

References

External links
 Official website
  Northern Stars on Facebook

 
ANZ Premiership teams
Netball teams in New Zealand
Netball teams in Auckland
Sports clubs established in 2016
2016 establishments in New Zealand